Douglas Kimball Holm (born February 11, 1953)  is a movie reviewer, Internet columnist, radio broadcaster, and author. Holm was born in Portland, Oregon. He attended David Douglas High School and the University of Oregon.

Published work
From 1976 to 1978, Holm was the co-editor and contributor to Cinemonkey film magazine (the magazine continues on in the form of a website by the same name). From 1985 to 1995, Holm was a film reviewer for the alternative weekly Willamette Week and from 1995 to 1998, film editor for the biweekly PDXS newspaper; both in Portland, Oregon. Holm is currently a columnist for Kevin Smith's website QuickStopEntertainment and film editor for the newspaper The Vancouver Voice (of Vancouver, Washington). Holm also regularly contributes to the paper's blog. Holm is additionally a co-host of the semi-weekly movie review radio program "On The Aisle" on KQAC. Holm has also appeared in a video performance piece by Miranda July called The Swan Tool, and as a cameo in James Westby's movie, Film Geek.

Books
As of 2006, Holm has authored five books. Robert Crumb (Pocket Essentials, 2003, revised edition 2005) is the first book-length critical study of the underground cartoonist published in English. R. Crumb: Conversations  (University Press of Mississippi, 2004) is an anthology of previously published interviews with Crumb spanning the cartoonist's career. Quentin Tarantino (Pocket Essentials, 2005) is a critical study of the film director's work. Kill Bill: An Unofficial Casebook (Glitter Books, 2005) is a time-coded annotation to Tarantino's film, and also includes an anthology of contemporary reviews. Film Soleil (Pocket Essentials, 2006) is a critical study of an aspect of film noir, also known as neo-noir.

Personal life
In 2008, Holm was diagnosed with esophageal cancer. A benefit was held at a local Portland theatre featuring a silent auction, readings of his more memorable reviews, and a musical appearance by (among others) Pink Martini's  Thomas Lauderdale, in April 2008.

References

A 1994 New York Times article on Portland in which Holm is quoted.

External links
Holm's column at QuickStopEntertainment.com
the online magazine Cinemonkey

American film critics
American columnists
Writers from Portland, Oregon
1953 births
Living people
American broadcasters
David Douglas High School alumni